The Flying Fool is a 1931 British comedy thriller film directed by Walter Summers and starring Henry Kendall, Benita Hume and Wallace Geoffrey. It was based on a 1929 play of the same name.

Plot
Vincent Floyd, a seeming lazy figure lounging around London Gentlemen's Clubs is in fact a secret agent hot on the trail of Michael Marlowe whom he suspects of smuggling drugs into Britain from France on a regular basis. Floyd has so far struggled to gain evidence on Marlowe, but through a series of incidents finds himself bound for Paris on the same plane as Marlowe. Marlowe succeeds in doping Floyd and taking him to his underground hideout beneath a Parisian back-alley nightclub.

With the help of Marion, a young woman who has been working for Marlowe, Floyd manages to escape the flooding dungeon linked to the River Seine which he has been trapped in. He flies back to England, pursued by Marlowe's gang and manages to avoid the attempts of his enemies to crash his plane. In a final confrontation, Floyd pursues Marlowe's car in a plane and prevents his escape.

Cast
 Henry Kendall as Vincent Floyd
 Benita Hume as Marion Lee
 Wallace Geoffrey as Michael Marlowe
 Martin Walker as Jim Lancer
 Ursula Jeans as Morella Arlen
 Barbara Gott as Madame Charron
 Charles Farrell as Ponder
 Syd Crossley as Hicks

Production
The film was based on a successful West End play of the same title by Arnold Ridley and Philip Merivale, who then adapted it into a screenplay. It was made by British International Pictures at Elstree Studios with sets designed by art directors Clarence Elder and John Mead. Originally Leslie Howard had been intended to star, but instead the role was given to the lead in the play Henry Kendall. Filming began in December 1930, and included large amounts of location shooting. Both the director and the star, Kendall, were able to fly during filming scenes. Co-operation was received from Imperial Airways, the French Air Union and the De Havilland Aircraft Company for the aviation sequences.

References

Bibliography
 Wood, Linda. British Films, 1927-1939. British Film Institute, 1986.

External links

1931 films
1930s comedy thriller films
1930s English-language films
British comedy thriller films
British aviation films
Films shot at British International Pictures Studios
Films directed by Walter Summers
Films set in London
Films set in England
Films set in Paris
British films based on plays
British black-and-white films
1931 comedy films
1930s British films